Otto Lubarsch (4 January 1860 – 1 April 1933) was a German pathologist and academic who was a native of Berlin.  Among other contributions to medical knowledge, Lubarsch provided the first detailed description of carcinoid tumors.

Academic career 
He originally studied philosophy and natural sciences in Leipzig and Heidelberg, and later on, earned his medical degree at the University of Strasbourg in 1883. Subsequently, he became an assistant to Hugo Kronecker at the Institute of Physiology in Bern, and afterwards served as an assistant at pathological institutes in Giessen, Breslau and Zurich. In 1891 he became first assistant to Albert Thierfelder at the pathological institute of the University of Rostock, where in 1894 he was appointed an associate professor of pathological anatomy and general pathology. In 1905 he became director of the institute of pathology and bacteriology at Zwickau, later serving as a professor in Düsseldorf (from 1907), Kiel (from 1913), and Berlin (1917–1929).

Contributions 
In 1888 Lubarsch provided the first detailed description of carcinoid tumors during autopsies of two male "patients", however it wouldn't be until 1907 that the term karzinoid was applied by Siegfried Oberndorfer. Lubarsch also discovered tiny crystals in the epithelial cells of the testis that resemble sperm crystals. These structures are now known as "Lubarsch' crystals".

With Friedrich Henke (1868–1943), he was editor of the Henke-Lubarsch Handbuch der Speziellen Pathologischen Anatomie und Histologie, which was a massive reference book containing information germane to pathology. It was founded in 1924, and produced over a forty-year span. After World War II, it was continued and edited by Robert Rössle. With veterinarian Robert von Ostertag, he collaborated on the journal Ergebnisse der allgemeinen Pathologie und pathologischen Anatomie der Menschen und der Tiere.

Associated eponyms 
Lubarsch' crystals Tiny crystals in the epithelial cells of the testis that resemble sperm crystals.
Lubarsch–Pick syndrome A combination of systematized amyloidosis with macroglossia. Named in conjunction with pathologist Ludwig Pick (1868–1944).

References

Further reading
 Otto Lubarsch at Who Named It
 Gastrointestinal Neuroendocrine Tumors

External links
 
 

1860 births
1933 deaths
Politicians from Berlin
German pathologists
German National People's Party politicians
Alldeutscher Verband members
German people of Jewish descent
Converts to Protestantism from Judaism
German Protestants
Academic staff of the University of Rostock
Academic staff of the University of Kiel
Scientists from Berlin